Sunvalley Group, previously known as Sunvalleytek International Inc.,  is a Chinese consumer electronics company founded in 2007 and headquartered in Shenzhen.

In addition to its headquarters in Shenzhen, the company has offices in San Francisco, Tokyo, Singapore, and Hamburg. It owns six consumer brands, including RAVPower, HooToo, Sable, TaoTronics, VAVA, and Anjou.

Brands
RAVPower: chargers and powerbanks
TaoTronics: Bluetooth headphones, Bluetooth speakers, and LED lamps.
HooToo: small electronics and accessories for smartphones and tablets
Sable: pillows and bedroom furniture.
VAVA: audio devices, such as speakers, and car cameras
Anjou: skin and body products

Amazon Ban
In June 2021 Amazon removed the Sunvalley brands RavPower, TaoTroncs and Vava from its platform, seemingly for ignoring Amazon’s rules.

References

Chinese companies established in 2007
Electronics companies established in 2007
Chinese brands